Ehsan Square is a plaza (Persian:فلکه, Local Pronunciation: Felke) in the Ma'ali Abad district of Shiraz, Iran, with roads connecting it towards the Shahrak Golestan and Sadra to its north and Farhang Shahr to its south.

Transportation
 Ehsan Metro Station (Shiraz)

Buildings and structures in Shiraz
Squares in Iran